Michael Stephen Cook (born 19 February 1939) is a former English cricketer.  Cook was a left-handed batsman who occasionally fielded as a wicket-keeper.  He was born at Edgbaston, Warwickshire.

Cook made two first-class appearances for Warwickshire, against Cambridge University in 1961 and Oxford University in 1962.  Against Cambridge University at Mitchells and Butlers' Ground, Cook scored 52 in his maiden first-class innings before he was run out.  In their second-innings, he was dismissed for 15 runs by Simon Douglas-Pennant, with Warwickshire winning the match by 51 runs.  Against Oxford University at Edgbaston, Cook scored 27 runs in Warwickshire's first-innings before he was dismissed by Colin Drybrough, while in their second-innings he was dismissed by Ian Potter for 16 runs.  Warwickshire won the match by 161 runs.  These were his only major appearances for Warwickshire.

His brother, David, also played for Warwickshire.

References

External links
Michael Cook at ESPNcricinfo
Michael Cook at CricketArchive

1939 births
Living people
People from Edgbaston
English cricketers
Warwickshire cricketers